Bhavani Jamakkalam refers to blankets and carpets manufactured in Bhavani in Erode district, Tamil Nadu. It has been recognized as a Geographical indication by the Government of India in 2005-06.

History
In the late nineteenth century, competition from British made textiles led Indian weavers to invent new types of garments. In Bhavani, a community of weavers called Jangamars weaved a type of blanket using colored coarse threads called Jamakkalam. The popularity of the product led to the production of jamakkalams by other weavers replacing the production of traditional sarees and other cloths.

Types
Two types of jamakkalams are produced in Bhavani. The first type is made from coarser cotton threads capable of producing carpets with colored bands. As the thread was coarser, designs could not be weaved on to this type of carpet. Hence, a second softer variety of jamakkalams were introduced that were made of artificial silk threads enabling weavers to weave different kinds of border designs. Jamakkalams are also used to make fashion products such as backpacks.

Community
Traditionally, jamakkalams were weaved by independent weavers in their houses. Later it moved into a system where jamakkalam is weaved by weavers on hand-looms supervised by master weavers. The master weavers lease hand-looms and contract weavers. The hand-looms are owned by trade merchants who procure raw materials such as thread from neighboring cities of Coimbatore, Salem and Karur. About 1500 workers are involved in the production of jamakkalams with women forming two-thirds of the work force.

Weaving loom
A pit loom is used to weave jamakkalams. The looms are made of wood with the threads stretched horizontally from end to end. The weaver sits in a pit dug in the ground, on level with the weaving surface. The weaver operates two pedals with his legs while enabling the hands to move the shuttle across to produce the weaving pattern.

Exports
The jamakkalams manufactured in Bhavani are exported to various countries such as Sweden, Germany, Italy, U.K., U.S. and Singapore. In 1993, Swedish major IKEA started procuring jamakkalams from Bhavani to be sold across its stores.

Competition
Since the 2000s, the hand weaved jamakkalams from Bhavani have faced competition from power-loom products. The Government of Tamil Nadu offers subsidy to weavers and has enacted laws to outlaw the use of power-looms. The government also sells the blankets through government run Co-optex stores. Competition from blankets produced in Solapur, Maharashtra and cheap imports from neighbors China, Bangladesh and Sri Lanka has resulted in drop in demand for Bhavani jamakkalams.

Geographical Indication
In 2005, the Government of Tamil Nadu applied for Geographical Indication for Bhavani jamakkalams. The Government of India recognized it as a Geographical indication officially since the year 2005-06.

In popular culture 
In 2021,Bhavani Jammakkalam -the film was produced by Amar Ramesh from Big short films production.

See also
 Abdul Gani Textile Market
 Erode Turmeric
 Nanjanagud banana

References

Bibliography

Indian handicrafts
Erode district
Textile industry in Tamil Nadu
Indian rugs and carpets
Geographical indications in Tamil Nadu